2016 Apatin Open is a darts tournament, which took take place in Apatin, Serbia on July 9th 2016. 77 men and 9 women participated.

Results

Men

Last 16

Women

References

Apatin Open darts
Apatin Open darts
Darts in Serbia
Apatin Open darts